Eric Thomas Potts (born 16 March 1950) is an English former professional footballer who played as a right winger.

References
 

1950 births
Living people
Footballers from Liverpool
English footballers
Association football wingers
Sheffield Wednesday F.C. players
Brighton & Hove Albion F.C. players
Preston North End F.C. players
Burnley F.C. players
Bury F.C. players
English Football League players